Jules Soccal (10 August 1907 – 11 January 1976) was a Monegasque sailor. He competed in the Dragon event at the 1960 Summer Olympics.

References

External links
 

1907 births
1976 deaths
Monegasque male sailors (sport)
Olympic sailors of Monaco
Sailors at the 1960 Summer Olympics – Dragon
Place of birth missing